Exastilithoxus fimbriatus is a species of armored catfish endemic to Venezuela where it is found in the Caroni and Matacuni River basins.  This species grows to a length of  SL.

References
 

Ancistrini
Fish of Venezuela
Endemic fauna of Venezuela
Fish described in 1915